Bijayapur Khola is a tributary of the Seti Gandaki River in Pokhara, Nepal.

References

Rivers of Gandaki Province